Higher Education Students’ Financing Board (HESFB) is a corporate body established by the act of the Ugandan parliament, number 2 of 2014,to provide loans and scholarship to students in Uganda to pursue higher education.

Eligibility 
Applicants must be Ugandan, they must been accepted into a recognized educational institution and they must be unable to afford tuition and other financial requirements.

References 

Uganda education-related lists
Student loan systems
Scholarships by country